Daniel William Daub (January 12, 1868 – March 25, 1951) was a 19th-century Major League Baseball pitcher born in Middletown, Ohio.

The New York Times reported on December 22, 1895, that Dan was among approximately 20 men who stoned and fired shotguns, also known as whitecapping, upon the home of Mrs. Wescoe of Hamilton, Ohio. Daub, who passes his winters in Mintonville, Ohio, was also among those that had warrants issued for his arrest.

After his playing career was over, Dan became the coach of the Ohio Wesleyan University baseball team, a post he held for the  season, then he resigned before the following season. His replacement was a ballplayer named Branch Rickey, who was recently ruled ineligible to play college ball due to his prior professional baseball career. Daub died at the age of 83 in Bradenton, Florida, and is interred at Hickory Flats Cemetery in Overpeck, Ohio.

References

External links

1868 births
1951 deaths
Baseball players from Ohio
Major League Baseball pitchers
Cincinnati Reds players
Denison Big Red baseball players
Ohio Wesleyan Battling Bishops baseball coaches
Brooklyn Grooms players
Brooklyn Bridegrooms players
19th-century baseball players
Sportspeople from Middletown, Ohio
Chattanooga Warriors players
Hartford Bluebirds players
Omaha Omahogs players
St. Joseph Saints players
Buffalo Bisons (minor league) players
Kansas City Blues (baseball) players
Marion Glass Blowers players
Sportspeople from the Cincinnati metropolitan area